24 Sextantis, often abbreviated as 24 Sex, is the Flamsteed designation of a 7th-magnitude star located approximately 236 light years away in the constellation of Sextans. At an apparent visual magnitude of 6.61, this star can only be viewed from rural skies under good seeing conditions.

At the age of 2.8 billion years, it has reached an evolutionary stage called a subgiant star, having a stellar classification of K0 IV. Previously it was an A-type main sequence star before using up the hydrogen at its core. It has 54% more mass than the Sun, but the outer envelope has become cooler than the Sun's as it slowly expands into a giant star.

The star is known to have two giant extrasolar planets.

Planetary system
On July 26, 2010 the California and Carnegie Planet Search team announced the discovery of two planets around 24 Sextantis along with two planets around HD 200964. The inner planet is twice as massive as Jupiter and takes 453 days to orbit the star in a circular orbit at the average distance of 1.33 AU (199 Gm). The outer planet is 5/6 the mass of Jupiter and takes 883 days to orbit eccentrically around the star at the average distance of 2.08 AU (312 Gm).

The two planets are in a 2:1 resonance, meaning that the outer planet orbits the star once every time when the inner planet orbits the star twice.
The planetary system was found to be unstable in 2019.

See also
 HD 200964
 Lists of exoplanets

References

Sextans (constellation)
K-type subgiants
Planetary systems with two confirmed planets
Sextantis, 24
090043
0050887
Durchmusterung objects